Rovana is an unincorporated community in Inyo County, California.

History
Rovana was established in 1947, when the US Vanadium corporation purchased the former Foreman Ranch near the mouth of Pine Creek Canyon as a housing site for workers at their high-altitude Pine Creek Mine, which had expanded due to military demand for tungsten during World War II.  By 1951 there were 85 houses in Rovana and later another 50, all still in use. Most were transported there from further up the canyon, where earlier mine-worker housing was vulnerable to heavy snow, avalanches, earthquakes, and mud slides.  The name came from "Ro" for Round Valley and "vana" for US Vanadium. The streets were named from states of the Union matching the letters in "Vanadium" (such as Nevada, Utah, and Montana).

The village of Scheelite, located closer to the Pine Creek Mine, was another company town for the mine.

Climate
This region experiences warm (but not hot) and dry summers, with no average monthly temperatures above 71.6 °F.  According to the Köppen Climate Classification system, Rovana has a warm-summer Mediterranean climate, abbreviated "Csb" on climate maps.

References

Unincorporated communities in Inyo County, California
Owens Valley
Unincorporated communities in California